"I Washed My Hands in Muddy Water" is a song written by Joe Babcock.

Stonewall Jackson recording
In 1965, the song was recorded by Stonewall Jackson.   His version reached number eight on Billboard's Hot Country Singles chart.

Cover versions
Lonnie Mack released an instrumental (electric guitar) version in 1965.
Charlie Rich recorded and released it on his 1965 album The Many New Sides of Charlie Rich.
The song was also a hit by Johnny Rivers in 1966, reaching number 19 on the Billboard Hot 100 chart.
Also in 1966, The Spencer Davis Group recorded the song for The Second Album. 
Siluete recorded a Serbo-Croatian version entitled "Moj srećan dom" ("My Happy Home") for the EP Dona (1967).
Elvis Presley recorded and released it on the album Elvis Country (I'm 10,000 Years Old) in 1971.
George Thorogood and the Destroyers recorded and released it on the album Ride 'Til I Die (2003)
Charley Crockett recorded and released it on the album Music City USA (2021)
The Grateful Dead performed it once live on December 5, 1971.

Notes and references

1965 singles
1965 songs
Stonewall Jackson (musician) songs
Elvis Presley songs
Johnny Rivers songs
Song recordings produced by Don Law
Columbia Records singles